Morton Grove is a commuter railroad station on Metra's Milwaukee District North Line in Morton Grove, Illinois. In Metra's zone-based fare system, Morton Grove is in zone C. As of 2018, Morton Grove is the 54th busiest of Metra's 236 non-downtown stations, with an average of 967 weekday boardings.

As of December 12, 2022, Morton Grove is served by 48 trains (25 inbound, 23 outbound) on weekdays, by all 20 trains (10 in each direction) on Saturdays, and by all 18 trains (nine in each direction) on Sundays and holidays.

Morton Grove station was originally built by the Chicago, Milwaukee, St. Paul and Pacific Railroad in 1892. Parking is available in front of the station, as well as along the side of sections Lehigh Avenue and Elm Street from Lehigh to the dead end at St. Paul Woods, part of the Cook County Forest Preserve.

Bus connections
Pace
 210 Lincoln Avenue
 250 Dempster Street (2 blocks north on Ferris at Dempster)

References

External links

Station from Lincoln Avenue from Google Maps Street View

Metra stations in Illinois
Former Chicago, Milwaukee, St. Paul and Pacific Railroad stations
Railway stations in the United States opened in 1892
Morton Grove, Illinois
Railway stations in Cook County, Illinois